Blossom Hill station may refer to:

 Blossom Hill station (Caltrain)
 Blossom Hill station (VTA)